Craig Sword (born January 16, 1994) is an American professional basketball player for the Capital City Go-Go of the NBA G League. He played college basketball for the Mississippi State Bulldogs.

High school career
Sword played high school basketball for George Washington Carver High School in Montgomery. His senior year, Sword led his team to the 6A state championship was named Alabama Mr. Basketball. Sword was listed as 4-star recruit by Rivals.com, and choose to attend Mississippi State over offers from Alabama, Auburn, and Georgia. While Sword committed to head coach Rick Stansbury, he kept his commitment to the Bulldogs when Stansbury was fired and replaced by Rick Ray.

College career
As a true freshman in 2012–13, Sword appeared all 32 games for the Bulldogs, starting 30 of them. He was named SEC Freshman of the Week twice, and led the Bulldogs with 10.5 points per game. The Bulldogs finished a dismal 4–14 in the SEC, however.

Sword improved his scoring clip in 2013–14 to 13.7 PPG as a sophomore. Sword scored his career high, 33 points, in a 91-82 loss to LSU.

Sword was sidelined with a back injury in the first half of his junior year in 2014–15. However, he returned to full form during the conference portion of the season, again leading the Bulldogs in scoring, leading the Bulldogs to a 6–12 conference record, and a generally much more competitive team. Sword was named Second Team All-SEC for his efforts.

Sword places ninth on the Bulldogs' career leaderboard with 144 steals.

Professional career

Wilki Morskie Szczecin (2016–2017)
After going undrafted in the 2016 NBA draft, Sword signed on June 25, 2016 with Wilki Morskie Szczecin of the Polish Basketball League, averaging 4.3 points, 1.9 rebounds, 1.1 assists and 11.7 minutes in 19 games.

Erie BayHawks (2017–2019)
On October 25, 2017, Sword signed with the Erie BayHawks of the NBA G League after a tryout.

On September 27, 2018, Sword re-signed with the Erie BayHawks. He joined the Grand Rapids Drive in 2019.

Omaha's Finest (2021)
In 2021, Sword signed with Omaha's Finest of The Basketball League.

Grand Rapids Gold (2021)
In October 2021, he joined the Grand Rapids Gold.

Capital City Go-Go (2021)
Sword was acquired by the Capital City Go-Go on November 3.

Washington Wizards (2021–2022)
On December 28, 2021, Sword signed a 10-day contract with the Washington Wizards.

Return to Capital City (2022–present)
On January 6, 2022, Sword was reacquired and activated by the Capital City Go-Go.

Career statistics

NBA

|-
| style="text-align:left;"| 
| style="text-align:left;"| Washington
| 3 || 0 || 6.3 || .750 || .000 || .000 || .0 || .3 || 1.3 || .0 || 2.0
|- class="sortbottom"
| style="text-align:center;" colspan="2"| Career
| 3 || 0 || 6.3 || .750 || .000 || .000 || .0 || .3 || 1.3 || .0 || 2.0

College

|-
| style="text-align:left;"| 2012–13
| style="text-align:left;"| Mississippi State
| 32 || 30 || 26.7 || .405 || .194 || .554 || 2.9 || 2.3 || 1.7 || .4 || 10.5
|-
| style="text-align:left;"| 2013–14
| style="text-align:left;"| Mississippi State
| 32 || 32 || 28.1 || .485 || .273 || .620 || 3.8 || 2.8 || 1.9 || .5 || 13.7
|-
| style="text-align:left;"| 2014–15
| style="text-align:left;"| Mississippi State
| 28 || 22 || 24.8 || .451 || .360 || .701 || 2.8 || 1.7 || 1.0 || .4 || 11.3
|-
| style="text-align:left;"| 2015–16
| style="text-align:left;"| Mississippi State
| 31 || 31 || 29.2 || .451 || .232 || .676 || 3.9 || 3.0 || 1.3 || .9 || 13.0
|- class="sortbottom"
| style="text-align:center;" colspan="2"| Career
|| 123 || 115 || 27.3 || .449 || .263 || .635 || 3.3 || 2.5 || 1.5 || .6 || 12.1

References

1994 births
Living people
American expatriate basketball people in Mexico
American expatriate basketball people in Poland
American men's basketball players
Basketball players from Montgomery, Alabama
Capital City Go-Go players
Erie BayHawks (2017–2019) players
Grand Rapids Drive players
Mississippi State Bulldogs men's basketball players
Rayos de Hermosillo players
Shooting guards
Undrafted National Basketball Association players
Washington Wizards players
United States men's national basketball team players